Codex Digital creates digital production workflow tools for motion pictures, commercials, independent films, and TV productions.

Codex products include recorders and media processing systems that transfer digital files and images from the camera to post-production. In addition to these processing systems, Codex also has tools for color, dailies creation, archiving, review, and digital asset management.

Codex is based out of London, UK, with offices in Los Angeles, CA, and Wellington, NZ.

In April, 2019, Codex was acquired by PIX System - designer of the PIX app for online collaboration and based in San Francisco, California.

Products
Codex was founded in 2005, and its first product was the Codex Studio recorder. It was introduced in 2005 and was used as the capture device for early digital cameras such as the Dalsa Origin, Thomson Viper, Panavision Gensis, and Sony F23 & F35. This was followed in 2007 by the Codex Portable Recorder, and by the Codex Onboard Recorder in 2010. Codex continued to work on miniaturizing its technology, partnering with ARRI to deliver its recording technology deeply integrated inside the ALEXA XT camera, recording to new high-performance.

Codex XR capture drives at up to 800MB/s. The technology was subsequently upgraded to support the requirements of the ALEXA 65 camera, with Codex SXR capture drives able to sustain 2500MB/s.

Codex has continued to support ARRI with built-in recording for the ALEXA SXT and ALEXA LF cameras. They also partnered with Canon on an integrated recording solution for the Canon C700 camera and with Panasonic on the VariCam Pure camera. In 2014, Codex also launched Codex Action Cam, a RAW-capable, tiny camera head, designed as a POV, Action or Witness camera.

Codex uses a "Virtual File System" meaning that when the recorded files are accessed, they can be viewed in a number of different resolutions and formats, and high performance, rugged, solid state recording media.

Codex recording solutions are used on most motion pictures shot today. Early projects included Tim Burton's "Alice in Wonderland," Michael Apted's "The Chronicles of Narnia: The Voyage of the Dawn Treader", Joseph Kosinski's "Tron Legacy", Roland Emmerich's "Anonymous", and Ang Lee's "Life of Pi." More recently, all Academy Awards for Best Cinematography predominately using digital capture have used Codex recording, including "Gravity", "Blade Runner 2049", "The Revenant", and "Roma."

Codex recorders are high-resolution media recording systems, designed to capture pictures and sound from digital cinematography cameras. The first cameras Codex supported were the ARRI Alexa, the Sony CineAlta series, the Panavision Genesis and the Arriflex D-21. They recorded twin 4:4:4 dual-link HD-SDI inputs for A & B camera or stereoscopic 3D work at up to 16-bits colour depth.

Codex products used a touchscreen interface and removable "data packs" containing up to 10TB of raid array disk storage. Interfaces for digital cinematography cameras include single and dual-link HD-SDI and Infiniband. 
2007 saw the introduction of the Codex portable recording system.

2010 saw the introduction of the Codex onboard recording system. Based on the larger Codex portable recorder, this is another compact, battery-powered variant which offers uncompressed and wavelet-based recording. The recorder mounts directly on the camera and weighs in at 2.5 kg.

Codex's workflow solutions include Vault, introduced in 2012. Vault is an ingest, processing and hardware device, designed to support multiple camera and media types.

Company History 
In 2005, Codex introduced the Codex Studio recorder as its first product. In 2012, Codex introduced the Onboard M recorder, the first to be certified by ARRI to record ARRIRAW from the ARRI Alexa camera.

In 2014,  ARRI Alexa 65 with Codex drives and workflow was announced. Codex handles camera processing in Vault hardware. Additionally, in 2014, Codex launched Action CAM – a RAW recording, and POV camera.

Codex was acquired by PIX System in 2019.

See also 
Arriflex Alexa
Arriflex D-21
Panavision Genesis
RED Digital Cinema

References

Film and video technology
Video storage